John York is an American pathologist who is the co-owner and co-chairman of the San Francisco 49ers.

John York may also refer to:

 John York (Master of the Mint) (died 1569), Master of the Mint
 John J. York, American actor
 John York (musician), American musician
 John M. York (1878–1949), lawyer and jurist in California

See also
 John Yorke (disambiguation)
 Jack York, Canadian slave